NH 49 may refer to:

 National Highway 49 (India)
 New Hampshire Route 49, United States